The 2015–16 Atlantic Sun Conference men's basketball season was the 38th season of Atlantic Sun Conference basketball.

The defending regular season and tournament champion was North Florida. It was the first season in the A-Sun for NJIT, who replaced Northern Kentucky following their departure for the Horizon League.

North Florida won their second straight regular season championship but were upset by Florida Gulf Coast in the 2016 Atlantic Sun men's basketball tournament semifinals.  Florida Gulf Coast defeated Stetson in the Tournament title game to win their second A-Sun Tournament championship and berth in the 2016 NCAA Men's Division I Basketball Tournament.

Postseason results

References